Justus Baldwin “Jock” Lawrence (December 16, 1903 – April 21, 1987) was a writer, an acknowledged public relations expert in the motion picture industry, and the U.S. Army’s chief public relations officer in Europe in World War II.

Early life
Lawrence was a native of Akron, Ohio. He graduated from Yale University in 1927 and settled in Hollywood, California. From 1933 to 1939 he was an assistant to Samuel Goldwyn, and from 1939 to 1941 was director of public relations for the Motion Picture Producers Association.

Military career
In 1942 he joined the U.S. Army and was assigned to Dwight D. Eisenhower’s headquarters in England. He represented Eisenhower at the headquarters of Lord Louis Mountbatten, who oversaw the training of British commando teams. In 1943, when Mountbatten was sent to Burma, Lawrence became chief public relations officer for the European Theater of Operations, U.S. Army.

After the war Lawrence became an executive of the J. Arthur Rank Corporation (a British movie studio) in the New York City office. In 1951 he returned to military service and was public relations officer at Dwight D. Eisenhower’s headquarters at NATO until 1952. He later started his own public relations firm, J.B. Lawrence, Inc., at which he worked until he retired.

Lawrence married, first, Mary Peace, who died in the early 1960s.  His second wife, Carlene, was an airline executive.  There were no children from either marriage.

Publications
“Include Me In,” about Hollywood and Sam Goldwyn
“You Can't Shoot an Empty Gun,” about his World War II experiences

References

External links
Papers of Justus Baldwin Lawrence, Dwight D. Eisenhower Presidential Library
Justus Baldwin Lawrence Papers (MS 1639). Manuscripts and Archives, Yale University Library.

1987 deaths
1903 births
20th-century American writers
20th-century American male writers
United States Army personnel of World War II